1988 Buenos Aires Grand Prix may refer to:

1988 Buenos Aires Grand Prix (tennis)
1988 Buenos Aires Grand Prix (motor racing), the Formula One race